Oncideres philosipes is a species of beetle in the family Cerambycidae. It was described by Dillon and Dillon in 1946. It is known from Peru and Ecuador.

References

philosipes
Beetles described in 1946